Gordon Leslie Simpson (born 21 September 1971) is a New Zealand-born rugby union player who played as a loose forward, formerly for Glasgow Caledonians and also representing Scotland. He was known by the nickname "badger" because of his ability to win the ball close to the ground.

New Zealand domestic career
He began his domestic career in his place of birth, Auckland, New Zealand and began playing there for the North Harbour National Provincial Championship team. Simpson then moved to the Wellington side, the Wellington Lions, in the same competition, while also playing for the Hurricanes in Super Rugby.

Following his International career, Gordon returned to the North Harbour team, captaining it on a few occasions, one of which being the side's first ever game at its current stadium, North Harbour Stadium. He then retired from first-class rugby, returning to  North Harbour's premier grade, having played in the grade more than a decade beforehand.

Scotland domestic career
Moving to Scotland in 1998 he initially played for Kirkcaldy RFC, briefly for Caledonia Reds, then for Glasgow Caledonians  (now Glasgow Warriors).

International career
He qualified to play for Scotland through his maternal grandfather, who was born in the Knightswood area of Glasgow. He made his debut against Australia in Sydney on 13 June 1998. He played in four matches at the World Cup in 1999.

He was recalled to the Scotland side in 2001, after a year where he had been injured. He played in the Six Nations 2000-2001 Championship.

He also represented New Zealand in NZ Secondary Schools, NZ U19 and NZ U21 age-grade levels.

References

External links
 

1971 births
Living people
Scottish rugby union players
Scotland international rugby union players
Rugby union players from Auckland
Glasgow Warriors players
Caledonia Reds players
Rugby union number eights
People from Takapuna